Gitelman is a surname. Notable people with the surname include:

Fred Gitelman (born 1965), Canadian-American bridge player
Peter Gitelman (1917–2008), Soviet army officer

Fictional characters
Hana Gitelman

See also
Gitelman syndrome